Shift (Japanese: シフト：断層 Hepburn: Shifuto: Dansō) is a 1982 Japanese short experimental film directed by Toshio Matsumoto.

References

External links 
 

1982 films
1980s Japanese films